The Great Black Swamp (also known simply as the Black Swamp) was a glacially fed wetland in northwest Ohio, sections of lower Michigan, and extreme northeast Indiana, United States, that existed from the end of the Wisconsin glaciation until the late 19th century. Comprising extensive swamps and marshes, with some higher, drier ground interspersed, it occupied what was formerly the southwestern part of proglacial Lake Maumee, a Holocene precursor to Lake Erie. Gradually drained and settled in the second half of the 19th century, it is now highly productive farmland. However, this development has been detrimental to the ecosystem as a result of agricultural runoff. This runoff, in turn, has contributed to frequent toxic algal blooms in Lake Erie.  

The land once covered by the swamp lies primarily within the Maumee River and Portage River watersheds in northwest Ohio and northeast Indiana.  The boundary was determined primarily by ancient sandy beach ridges formed on the shores of Lakes Maumee and Whittlesey, after glacial retreat several thousand years ago.  It stretched roughly from Fort Wayne, Indiana, eastward to the Ottawa National Wildlife Refuge near Port Clinton along the Lake Erie shore, and from (roughly) US 6 south to Findlay and North Star, Ohio in Darke County. Near its southern edge at the southwestern corner of present-day Auglaize County, wheeled transportation was impossible during most of the year, and local residents thought the rigors of travel to be unsuitable for anyone except adult men.

The vast swamp was a network of forests, wetlands, and grasslands. In the lowest, flattest areas, prone to permanent inundation, deciduous swamp forests predominated, characterized especially by species of ash, elm, cottonwood and sycamore.  In slightly higher areas with some topographic relief and better drainage, beech, maples, basswood, tuliptree and other more mesic species were dominant.  On elevated beach ridges and moraines with good to excessive drainage, more xeric species, especially oak and hickory, were dominant. The area contained non-forested wetlands, particularly marsh and wet prairies, with marshes being particularly extensive along the Lake Erie shoreline east of Toledo.

Draining the swamp

Although much of the area to the east, south, and north was settled in the early 19th century, the dense habitat and difficulty of travel through the swamp delayed its development by several decades. A corduroy road (from modern-day Fremont, Ohio, to Perrysburg, Ohio) was constructed through the Maumee Road Lands in 1825, and was overlaid with gravel in 1838. Travel in the wet season could still take days or even weeks. The impassibility of the swamp was an obstacle during the so-called Toledo War (1835–36); unable to traverse the swamp, the Michigan and Ohio militias never came to battle. Settlement of the region was also inhibited by endemic malaria. The disease was a chronic problem for residents of the region until the area was drained and former mosquito-breeding grounds were dried up.

In the 1850s, the states began an organized attempt to drain the swamp for agricultural use and ease of travel. Various projects were undertaken over a 40-year period. Bowling Green, Ohio, resident James B. Hill expedited draining swampy areas with his Buckeye Traction Ditcher. Hill's ditching machine laid drainage tiles at a record pace. The area was largely drained and settled over the next three decades. The development of railroads and a local drainage tile industry are thought to have contributed greatly to drainage and settlement.

Restoration

During the second half of the 20th century, efforts were undertaken to preserve and restore portions of the swamp to its pre-settlement state (e.g. Limberlost Swamp) After the excessive spread of harmful algal blooms in nearby western Lake Erie returned in 2011 and every year since then, there has been renewed interest in restoring wetlands in the drained Black Swamp area.

The Black Swamp Conservancy, founded in 1993, has also been involved in preserving former swamplands.  They currently protect 17,600 acres spread throughout the Northwest Ohio region.

See also
Limberlost Swamp

References

Bibliography

Further reading
The story of the first European settlement in 1833 in the Great Black Swamp at Lauber Hill is told in "Out of the Wilderness, History of the Central Mennonite Church," 1835-1960. O. Grieser and E. Beck, The Dean Hicks Company, Grand Rapids Michigan, 1960.

External links
"The Story of the Great Black Swamp", 1982 WBGU-PBS documentary.
"Swamp Survivors", Game and Lesson Plan for 6-7th grades, Northwest Ohio Educational Technology et al.
Black Swamp Bird Observatory, a nonprofit promoting bird conservation.
The Black Swamp Conservancy Website, an organization dedicated to preserving the swamp.
Maumee Valley Heritage Corridor Website.
"Mitsch, William J., Solving Lake Erie’s harmful algal blooms by restoring the Great Black Swamp in Ohio". Ecological Engineering, November 2017.
"Levy, Sharon, Learning to Love the Great Black Swamp", March 31, 2017, UNDARK blog.
"Restoration of historic Great Black Swamp could help save Lake Erie Henry, Thomas, Toledo Blade, September 22, 2017
"They aren’t mean and they aren’t trying to get you: saving the copperbelly water snake", The Guardian,Tue 14 Feb 2023 02.45 EST

History of Indiana
History of Ohio
Swamps of Indiana
Swamps of Ohio
Geological history of the Great Lakes
Lake Erie